Elad Shahaf (born 13 January 1998) is an Israeli professional footballer who plays as a midfielder for Israeli Premier League side F.C. Ashdod. Shahaf started his career in Israel at Maccabi Netanya, then playing for teams such as Sektzia Ness Ziona, Hapoel Nof HaGalil or Kafr Qasim, before moving to Romania and signing with top-flight club FC Botoșani.

Honours
Maccabi Netanya
Liga Leumit: 2016–17
Toto Cup runner-up: 2018–19

References

External links
 
 

1998 births
Living people
Israeli footballers
Footballers from Herzliya
Maccabi Netanya F.C. players
Sektzia Ness Ziona F.C. players
Hapoel Nof HaGalil F.C. players
F.C. Kafr Qasim players
FC Botoșani players
F.C. Ashdod players
Israeli Premier League players
Liga Leumit players
Liga I players
Israeli expatriate footballers
Expatriate footballers in Romania
Israeli expatriate sportspeople in Romania
Association football midfielders